Lake Sai Bat Cave (Saiko Kōmori Ana) is the largest of the several lava tubes that are near Lake Sai, in the Aokigahara forest in the northern side of Mount Fuji, Japan. It is known as a cave where visitors can observe the bats which live there.

Caves in Aokigahara Forest
In the Aokigahara forest, that was created by the results of the lava flow of the 864 A.D. eruption of Mt. Fuji, there are several lava tubes, of which the major three are: 
 Narusawa Ice Cave, in Narusawa Village, Yamanashi Prefecture
 Fugaku Wind Cave, in Fujikawaguchiko Town, Yamanashi Pref.
Lake Sai Bat Cave, also in Fujikawaguchiko Town, Yamanashi Prefecture

All three were designated as Natural Monuments of Japan in 1929.

Lake Sai Bat Cave
The Lake Sai Bat Cave is 386.5 meters long and is the largest of the three major caves in Aokigahara. It is located at 925 meters above sea level.

Bats
The visitors to the Saiko Bat Cave can observe about 500 bats which live in there. The bats are of five kinds::
Greater horseshoe bat
Little Japanese horseshoe bat
Eastern long-fingered bat
Brown long-eared bat
Japanese long-eared bat
Hilgendorf's tube-nosed bat

Lake Sai Nature Center
Lake Sai Nature Center was built recently next to the entrance of the Bat Cave. Walking tours through Aokigahara Forest can be arranged with the Fujikawaguchiko, Yamanashi-approved tour guides.
Next to the Nature Center is the exhibition hall of Kunimasu trout which was declared extinct ca. 1945 up north in Lake Tazawa, Akita Prefecture, but was discovered in Lake Sai in 2010.

Transportation

Public bus transportation is available from Kawaguchiko Station of Fujikyūkō railway. By car, 13.1 km (about 25 minutes) on Japan National Route 139, from Lake Kawaguchi exit of Chūō Expressway.

See also
Fugaku Wind Cave
Narusawa Ice Cave

References

External links
 Lake Sai Bat Cave (The Official Travel Guide of Yamanashi Prefecture 
 Saiko nature center (Kunimasu Museum, Saiko bat cave) - Fujikawaguchiko Tourist Information 

Caves of Japan
Tourist attractions in Yamanashi Prefecture
Geography of Yamanashi Prefecture
Lava tubes
Natural monuments of Japan
Mount Fuji
Bat conservation